Epipygidae is a lineage of froghoppers in the insect superfamily Cercopoidea. There are at least three genera and about five described species in Epipygidae, found in the American tropics. In addition, there are more than 20 undescribed species in the family. Molecular analyses indicate that the group is monophyletic, but is clearly nested within the family Aphrophoridae and is probably best relegated to the status of a subfamily or tribe, rather than retained as a separate family.

Genera
These three genera belong to the family Epipygidae:
 Eicissus Fowler, 1897
 Epipyga Hamilton, 2001
 Erugissa Hamilton, 2001

References

Hemiptera
Auchenorrhyncha families